Nikki Martin (legal name Nicole Heaps) is an American lifestyle TV personality, author and celebrity chef, currently based in Los Angeles, California.  She is perhaps best known as a chef on the eighth season of the Food Network series Food Network Star.

Early life

Martin was born in Long Beach, CA.  At the young age of 17, she moved to Hollywood to pursue a career in entertainment.  After a few television shows, movie appearances and a short stint at Harvard University, she decided her path was in lifestyle TV and the culinary arts. She has no formal culinary training and actually had attended Harvard to study and pursue medicine. But after realizing her path was set for the big screen and a life of creative endeavors, she merged her two passions of food and entertainment. In 2010, Martin auditioned for a Food Network show to begin her new career as a celebrity chef and lifestyle TV personality. Martin graduated from Aliso Niguel High School in 1998. Today Martin resides in Los Angeles, as a private chef for various A-list celebrities. She has founded one of the Top Underground Dinner Clubs in the US known as The Roulette Society. She has a pop culture cookbook titled The Burn CookBook based on the cult classic flick Mean Girls. The book is being published by Grand Central Publishing and is set to be released Fall of 2018 with her authoring partner and actor, Jonathan Bennett.

Early media roles and Food Network
Martin has appeared on numerous television shows, including Titus, Scrubs and Birds of Prey; as well as films like Sorority Boys and Looney Tunes: Back in Action. She appeared on the Food Network series 24 Hour Restaurant Battle in July 2011, competing with her best friend, Dana Chaney. Since her first Food Network appearance she has been featured as a celebrity chef on several food and lifestyle programming including Chopped Grill Masters, Bravo's hit show Going Off the Menu and is most remembered for her participation in the series Food Network Star; where Martin made a name for herself in the grilling world as "The Grill Next Door".

Food Network Star

In May 2012, Martin was chosen as a contestant on Food Network Star, season 8; she was mentored by Bobby Flay. She originally used the tagline “girl-on-grill”, but because Food Network president Bob Tuschman found the double entendre to be too risqué, she subsequently started calling herself “the grill next door”. Martin was eliminated from the show on July 15, placing in the top six.

Filmography

Film

Television

Notes

References

External links

1980s births
Actresses from California
American television chefs
American film actresses
American television actresses
Date of birth missing (living people)
Food Network Star contestants
Living people
Participants in American reality television series
American women chefs
Food Network chefs
Reality casting show winners
21st-century American women writers
American cookbook writers
American women non-fiction writers
21st-century American non-fiction writers